Bo Björkman is a retired Swedish footballer. Björkman made 24 Allsvenskan appearances for Djurgården and scored 9 goals.

References

Swedish footballers
Allsvenskan players
Djurgårdens IF Fotboll players
Association footballers not categorized by position
Year of birth missing